Gliricidia sepium, often simply referred to as its genus name Gliricidia, is a medium size leguminous tree belonging to the family Fabaceae. It is an important multi-purpose legume tree, with a native range from Mexico to Colombia, but now widely introduced to other tropical zones.

Description

The bark is smooth, and its color can range from a whitish gray to deep red-brown.

The flowers are located on the end of branches that have no leaves. These flowers have a bright pink to lilac color that is tinged with white. A pale yellow spot is usually at the flower's base.

It is green when unripe and becomes yellow-brown when it reaches maturity. The pod produces four to ten round brown seeds.

G. sepium is native to tropical dry forests in Mexico and Central America. In addition to its native range it is cultivated in many tropical and subtropical regions, including the Caribbean, northern parts of South America, central Africa, parts of India,parts of Sri Lanka, parts of Myanmar and Southeast Asia.

The tree grows well in acidic soils with a pH of 4.5-6.2. The tree is found on volcanic soils in its native range in Central America and Mexico. However, it can also grow on sandy, clay, and limestone soils.

Uses
G. sepium was spread from its native range throughout the tropics to shade plantation crops such as coffee. Today it is used for many other purposes including live fencing, fodder, firewood, green manure, intercropping, and  rat poison. Its use expanded following the widespread defoliation of Leucaena by psyllid in the 1980s.  In the charsutri method of paddy cultivation, leaves of glyricidia are incorporated in soil during ploughing.

Fodder
G. sepium is used as cut and carry forage for cattle, sheep, and goats. Its high protein content allows it to complement low-quality tropical forages. G. sepium can tolerate repeated cutting, every 2 to 4 months depending on the climate. Cutting G. sepium causes it to retain its leaves during the dry season when many forage crops have lost their leaves. In some cases it is the only source of feed during the dry season.

Intercropping
G. sepium trees are used for intercropping in part because they fix nitrogen in the soil and tolerate low soil fertility, so when they are interplanted with crops they can boost crop yields significantly, without the need of chemical fertilizers.

G. Sepium tolerates being cut back to crop height, and can even be coppiced, year after year. When the trees are cut back, they enter a temporary dormant state during which their root systems do not compete for nutrients needed by the crops, so the crops can establish themselves.

These properties also enable G. Sepium to be used as green manure.

Soil stabilization
G. sepium is a fast-growing ruderal species that takes advantage of slash and burn practices in its native range. Because it is easily propagated and grows quickly, it is also planted to prevent topsoil erosion in the initial stages of reforesting denuded areas, and as an intermediate step to be taken before introducing species that take longer to grow.

Shade trees
The common name madre de cacao (literally "mother of cacao" in Spanish) used in Central America and the Philippines is in reference to its traditional use as shade trees for cocoa tree plantations.

Other
G. sepium is widely used in the form of poles for live fencing in Cuba and India. This is one of the best plants used for traditional live fencing to protect agriculture and fruit bearing plantations from animals such as goats, cow, and buffalo. As a Caribbean native, G. sepium has traditionally been used for live fencing in Cuba.

As in India, during the recent past one could see many living fences around mango and cashew orchards and agricultural properties in Goa, Maharashtra and Karnataka, erected with G. sepium and tied with bamboo rafters.

G. sepium is also used for its insect repellent properties. Farmers in Latin America often wash their livestock with a paste made of crushed G. sepium leaves to ward off torsalos (botflies). In the Philippines, the extract obtained from its leaves is made into anti-mange dog shampoo.

Limitations
G. sepium seems to be toxic to non-ruminants. The generic name Gliricidia means "mouse killer" in reference to the traditional use of its toxic seeds and bark as rodenticides.

Some palatability challenges have been reported; animals seem to refuse the leaves on the basis of smell, but this depends on management and geography.

Another limitation is frost intolerance and the lack of adaptation to a cool season: it is a tropical plant.

In terms of cultivation, it requires the presence of pollinators, and it needs a dry season to germinate.

Further, it has invasive potential: its swift propagation has caused it to be considered a weed in Jamaica.

Until now G. sepium has remained free of serious diseases; only a number of insect problems are reported in exotic environments, but there are issues with defoliation under humid conditions.

Names in other Languages 

In Indonesian Gliricidia sepium is known as gamal, which is an acronym for Ganjang Malaysia (Down with Malaysia.)

References

External links
2.2 "Gliricidia sepium - a Multipurpose Forage Tree Legume" in Forage Tree Legumes in Tropical Agriculture, Edited by Ross C. Gutteridge and H. Max Shelton. Tropical Grassland Society of Australia Inc.
 Gliricidia sepium (Jacq.) Steud. Purdue University.

Robinieae
Trees of the Philippines
Trees of Central America
Trees of South America
Trees of Mexico
Plants described in 1760
Taxa named by Nikolaus Joseph von Jacquin
Ruderal species
Trees of Guatemala